Parapoynx andreusialis is a moth of the family Crambidae. It is found in India.

This species has a wingspan of 18 mm.

References

Acentropinae